The Hokitika River is in the West Coast of the South Island of New Zealand. The river then feeds into the offshore Hokitika Canyon, which merges with the Cook Canyon to form the Cook Channel.

The Hokitika River, and its eastern tributary, the Kokatahi River, have formed the Kowhitirangi-Kokatahi alluvial plain; a fertile and productive land extensively used for dairy farming.

The entrance to the Hokitika River was once used as a harbour during the West Coast Gold Rush; however, the sand bar at the river mouth created a treacherous and often fatal obstacle - resulting in many shipwrecks. After the gold-rush subsided, the use of the river as a harbour declined and is now no longer used.

References

 http://www.teara.govt.nz/1966/H/HokitikaRiver/HokitikaRiver/en

Westland District
Rivers of the West Coast, New Zealand
Rivers of New Zealand